Berwick is an unincorporated community in Nemaha County, Kansas, United States.

History
Berwick was a station on the Chicago, Rock Island and Pacific Railroad.

In 1916, Berwick contained but four houses.

A post office was opened in Berwick in 1887, and remained in operation until it was discontinued in 1937.

Education
The community is served by Prairie Hills USD 113 public school district.

References

Further reading

External links
 Nemaha County maps: Current, Historic, KDOT

Unincorporated communities in Nemaha County, Kansas
Unincorporated communities in Kansas
1887 establishments in Kansas
Populated places established in 1887